Hemiphragma is a genus of flowering plants belonging to the family Plantaginaceae.

Its native range is Himalaya to China and Central Malesia.

Species:
 Hemiphragma heterophyllum Wall.

References

Plantaginaceae
Plantaginaceae genera